

Births and deaths

Deaths
 Peter Bellamy (1944–1991)
 Stan Hugill (1906–1992)
 Walter Pardon (1914–1996)

Recordings
 1990: Roots and Wing (Sheila Chandra)
 1990: The Five Seasons (Fairport Convention)
 1991: Carols and Capers (Maddy Prior)
 1991: The Woodworm Years (Fairport Convention)
 1992: Angel Tiger (June Tabor)
 1993: Signs (Kathryn Tickell)
 1994: 25th Anniversary Concert (Fairport Convention)
 1995: Jewel in the Crown (Fairport Convention)
 1995: Common Tongue (Waterson–Carthy)
 1996: Heat Light and Sound (Eliza Carthy)
 1996: Old New Borrowed Blue (Fairport Convention)
 1996: Time (Steeleye Span)
 1997: Who Knows Where the Time Goes (Fairport Convention)
 1997: Hourglass (Kate Rusby)
 1998: The Cropredy Box (Fairport Convention)  
 1998: Infinite Blue (The Poozies)
 1998: Horkstow Grange (Steeleye Span)
 1999: Meet On the Ledge: The Classic Years 1967-1975 (Fairport Convention)
 1999: Cropredy 98 (Fairport Convention)
 1999: Ravenchild (Maddy Prior)
 1999: Sleepless (Kate Rusby)

See also
Music of the United Kingdom (1990s)
Music of the United Kingdom (2000s)

English folk music by date
1990s in British music
1990s in England